Srđan Cerović (born 7 March 1971) is a retired football player and manager.

Playing career
Cerović began playing football for FK Sloboda Užice in the Serbian second division.

In 1995, Cerović joined Greek Superleague side Panachaiki F.C. for two seasons. He played for several other Greek clubs, including second division side Ethnikos Olympiakos Volos F.C. during 2002–03 season.

Career as a manager
Following his playing career, Cerović became a manager, leading his former club Niki Volos in 2008.

References

External links
ΞΕΝΟΙ ΠΑΙΚΤΕΣ ΚΑΙ ΠΡΟΠΟΝΗΤΕΣ ΤΗΣ ΠΑΝΑΧΑΪΚΗΣ

1971 births
Living people
Serbian footballers
FK Sloboda Užice players
Panachaiki F.C. players
Kallithea F.C. players
Olympiacos Volos F.C. players
Niki Volos F.C. players
Korinthos F.C. players
Association football midfielders
Super League Greece players
Serbian expatriate footballers
Expatriate footballers in Greece
Serbian expatriate sportspeople in Greece